The 2003 NCAA National Collegiate Women's Ice Hockey Tournament involved four schools playing in single-elimination play to determine the national champion of women's NCAA Division I college ice hockey. It began on March 21, 2003, and ended with the championship game on March 23. A total of four games were played.

Frozen Four

Note: * denotes overtime period(s)

Notes
UMD made women's hockey history as the Bulldogs won their third straight NCAA Frozen Four tournament. The Bulldogs defeated Harvard in a double overtime win 4–3. The game was held in Duluth, Minnesota in front of the largest crowd in women's hockey NCAA history (5,167). Nora Tallus scored the game winner 4:19 into the second overtime.

All-Tournament Team
 G: Amy Ferguson, Dartmouth
 D: Julie Chu, Harvard
 D: Angela Ruggiero, Harvard
 F: Caroline Ouellette, Minnesota–Duluth* 
 F: Jenny Potter,  Minnesota–Duluth
 F: Hanne Sikio, Minnesota–Duluth

* Most Outstanding Player(s)

References

NCAA Women's Ice Hockey Tournament
2003 in sports in Minnesota